Timothy Stuart Jones (born 1971) is an American composer and musician. Jones has composed scores for film and television.

Jones is perhaps best known as the composer for five seasons (91 episodes) of Chuck on NBC. Jones also took over scoring duties on season 2 of Human Target on Fox.

Tim Jones, who majored in film scoring, graduated in 1994 with a bachelor's degree from the Berklee College of Music in Boston.

His TV work brought him to the attention of Mark Mothersbaugh.  Working with Mark led to Jones doing additional music for portions of the Marvel film, Thor: Ragnarok.  He also provided additional score for Lego Movie 2, Holmes and Watson and most recently Mitchell’s vs.The Machines and Hotel Transylvania: Transformania.  Because of Jones’ work with Mothersbaugh on Thor: Ragnarok, Marvel asked him to be a part of the music team on Captain Marvel.  He also was brought in by Janusz Kaminski to compose additional score for his film, American Dream.

Jones has also completed films with several new directors.  Lin Oeding, (Office Uprising and Braven); Jesper Ganslandt, (Beast of Burden and Snabba Cash), and Joel David Moore, (Hide and Seek). Jones also has a long relationship with Dir/Prod Mike Elliot for whom he has written four scores: American Pie Presents: Girls’ Rules, Smoking Aces: Assassins' Ball, Secrets of Emily Blair and Santa Girl.

In 2021, being credited as Timothy Stuart Jones, He worked with director James Cullen Bressack on the Bruce Willis films, Survive the Game and Fortress. Jones also scored the documentary film Waterman, directed by Isaac Halasima, about the legendary figure Duke Kahanamoku. This film will premiere on PBS in Spring 2022.

Filmography
Hot Seat
Hide and Seek
Survive The Game
Waterman
American Pie Presents: Girls' Rules
Santa Girl
Office Uprising
Beast of Burden
Abolitionists
Cult
Human Target
Chuck
Smokin' Aces 2: Assassins' Ball
The Death and Life of Bobby Z
Wicked Little Things
8mm 2
Karla
Sniper 3
Vampires: The Turning
Alien Hunter
True Blue
Duel
The Forsaken
The Sculptress
Manna from Heaven
A Dark Foe

References

External links

 

1971 births
Living people
American film score composers
American television composers
Berklee College of Music alumni
Place of birth missing (living people)
Musicians from Los Angeles